Nicholas Joseph Balthazar de Langlade, vicomte du Chayla, baron de Montauroux et Chambon, seigneur de Champs (c. 1685 – 17 December 1754, Paris), was a French general. He was a lieutenant general of the king's armies and director general of the cavalry. In 1708 he was made a knight of the royal and military Order of Saint Louis. On 2 February 1746 he was made a knight of the Order of the Holy Spirit. He commanded the French force at the Battle of Melle.

Sources
Nicolas Viton de Saint-Allais, Nobiliaire universel de France ou Recueil général des généalogies historiques des maisons nobles, vol. 8, 1816 Langlade du Chayla de Montgros
Gustave de Burdin, Documents historiques sur la province de Gévaudan, vol. 1, 1846

1685 births
1754 deaths
French generals